Stockbridge is a town in Madison County, New York, United States. The population was 2,103 at the 2010 census. The name is derived from a group of Native Americans.

The Town of Stockbridge is located on the eastern border of the county.

History 

The land surrounding where Stockbridge would be established, was being lived upon by "Stockbridge Indians" (as local settlers would refer to them), who had been relocated already to the New Stockbridge Indian Territory during the latter half the 18th century, being told that this land was to be reserved for future tribal generations. The Stockbridge, refuges of tribes mainly of adjoining New York that had settled in the "prayer town" of Stockbridge, Massachusetts, accepted an invitation of the Oneidas to live and share on their reservation in New York. Subsequent disagreements with White settlers caused many Stockbridge Indians to relocate to Indiana and later to Wisconsin, where they became the Stockbridge Munsee Band of Mohican Indians.  Stockbridge is the birthplace of meatpacking industrialist Philip Danforth Armour and brother Herman Ossian Armour.

The town was first settled in 1791 by pioneers from New England. The town was formed in 1836 by composing parts of four other towns: Augusta, Lenox, Smithfield and Vernon.

Geography
The east town line is the border of Oneida County.

Demographics

As of the census of 2000, there were 2,080 people, 739 households, and 571 families residing in the town.  The population density was 65.7 people per square mile (25.4/km2).  There were 802 housing units at an average density of 25.3 per square mile (9.8/km2).  The racial makeup of the town was 96.63% White, 0.38% African American, 0.91% Native American, 0.29% Asian, 0.24% from other races, and 1.54% from two or more races. Hispanic or Latino of any race were 0.82% of the population.

There were 739 households, out of which 37.9% had children under the age of 18 living with them, 60.4% were married couples living together, 10.7% had a female householder with no husband present, and 22.6% were non-families. 17.9% of all households were made up of individuals, and 8.7% had someone living alone who was 65 years of age or older.  The average household size was 2.81 and the average family size was 3.14.

In the town, the population was spread out, with 29.5% under the age of 18, 8.1% from 18 to 24, 29.6% from 25 to 44, 22.1% from 45 to 64, and 10.8% who were 65 years of age or older.  The median age was 35 years. For every 100 females, there were 101.7 males.  For every 100 females age 18 and over, there were 98.8 males.

The median income for a household in the town was $37,700, and the median income for a family was $41,250. Males had a median income of $30,701 versus $21,712 for females. The per capita income for the town was $15,856.  About 9.9% of families and 12.9% of the population were below the poverty line, including 13.9% of those under age 18 and 12.3% of those age 65 or over.

Communities and locations in Stockbridge 
Bridges Corners – A location in the southeastern part of the town.
Five Chimneys Corner – A hamlet by the northern town line.
Munns – A hamlet northeast of Munnsville.  It was formerly called "Munnsyule."
Munnsville – The Village of Munnsville on Route 46.
Stockbridge – The hamlet of Stockbridge on Route 46, north of Munnsville.
Stockbridge Falls – A waterfall located southwest of Munnsville.
Valley Mills – A hamlet northeast of Stockbridge village.

References

External links
  Early Stockbridge history
  Brief history of Stockbridge indians

Syracuse metropolitan area
Towns in Madison County, New York